Holt County is a county located in the northwestern portion of the U.S. state of Missouri. As of the 2020 census, the population was 4,223. It's county seat is Oregon. The county was organized February 15, 1841. Originally named Nodaway County, it was soon renamed for David Rice Holt (1803–1840), a Missouri state legislator from Platte County.

History 
The History of Holt County, Missouri from the Time of the Platte Purchase through 1916 and The History of Holt and Atchison Counties, Missouri (published 1882) are available online.

In 1972, the Holt County Historical Society was established.

Holt County was impacted by the 2019 Midwestern U.S. floods. About 30,000 acres (12,140 hectares) of the 95,000 acres (38,445 hectares) that flooded in spring 2019 were still underwater in late October. Some of the floodwater was expected to freeze in place over the winter.

Geography

Adjacent counties
Atchison County (north)
Nodaway County (northeast)
Andrew County (southeast)
Doniphan County, Kansas (south)
Brown County, Kansas (southwest)
Richardson County, Nebraska (west)
Nemaha County, Nebraska (northwest)

Major highways
Interstate 29
U.S. Route 59
U.S. Route 159
Route 111
Route 113
Route 118

Demographics

As of the census of 2000, there were 5,351 people, 2,237 households, and 1,503 families residing in the county.  The population density was 12 people per square mile (4/km2).  There were 2,931 housing units at an average density of 6 per square mile (2/km2).  The racial makeup of the county was 98.47% White, 0.11% Black or African American, 0.47% Native American, 0.07% Asian, 0.02% Pacific Islander, 0.11% from other races, and 0.75% from two or more races. Approximately 0.39% of the population were Hispanic or Latino of any race.

There were 2,237 households, out of which 28.20% had children under the age of 18 living with them, 57.30% were married couples living together, 6.10% had a female householder with no husband present, and 32.80% were non-families. 29.70% of all households were made up of individuals, and 16.70% had someone living alone who was 65 years of age or older.  The average household size was 2.35 and the average family size was 2.91.

In the county, the population was spread out, with 23.80% under the age of 18, 6.50% from 18 to 24, 24.40% from 25 to 44, 23.90% from 45 to 64, and 21.50% who were 65 years of age or older.  The median age was 42 years. For every 100 females there were 97.70 males.  For every 100 females age 18 and over, there were 92.80 males.

The median income for a household in the county was $29,461, and the median income for a family was $35,685. Males had a median income of $26,966 versus $17,846 for females. The per capita income for the county was $15,876.  About 10.50% of families and 13.00% of the population were below the poverty line, including 15.90% of those under age 18 and 11.90% of those age 65 or over.

2020 Census

Education

Public schools
Craig R-III School District – Craig
Craig Elementary School (K-06)
Craig High School (07-12)
Mound City R-II School District – Mound City
Mound City Elementary School (PK-04)
Mound City Middle School (05-08)
Mound City High School (09-12)
South Holt County R-I School District – Oregon
South Holt County Elementary School (K-06)
South Holt County High School (07-12)

Public libraries
Mound City Public Library  
Oregon Public Library

Politics

Local
The Republican Party predominantly controls politics at the local level in Holt County. Republicans hold all but one of the elected positions in the county.

State

All of Holt County is a part of Missouri's 1st District in the Missouri House of Representatives and is represented by  Allen Andrews (R-Grant City).

All of Holt County is a part of Missouri's 12th District in the Missouri Senate and is currently represented by Dan Hegeman (R-Cosby).

Federal

All of Holt County is included in Missouri's 6th Congressional District and is currently represented by Sam Graves (R-Tarkio) in the U.S. House of Representatives.

Political culture

Missouri presidential preference primary (2008)

U.S. Senator and former First Lady Hillary Clinton (D-New York) received more votes, a total of 283, than any candidate from either party in Holt County during the 2008 presidential primary.

Points of interest
Squaw Creek National Wildlife Refuge
Big Lake State Park on Big Lake
St. John's Evangelical Lutheran Church (Corning, Missouri)

Communities

Cities
Craig
Forest City
Maitland
Mound City
Oregon (county seat)

Villages
Big Lake
Bigelow
Corning
Fortescue

Unincorporated communities

 Curzon
 Forbes
 New Point
 Nichols Grove
 Richville

Notable people
Frank McGrath - actor, born in Mound City in 1903
Charles C. Moore - 13th Governor of Idaho; born in Holt County.
Roger Wehrli - NFL athlete inducted into the Hall of Fame, born in New Point

See also
National Register of Historic Places listings in Holt County, Missouri

References

External links
 Digitized 1930 Plat Book of Holt County  from University of Missouri Division of Special Collections, Archives, and Rare Books

 
Missouri counties
1841 establishments in Missouri
Populated places established in 1841
Missouri counties on the Missouri River